FC Mtskheta, renamed to Mtskheta-Urioni in the 2003–04 season, was a Georgian association football club based in Mtskheta.

The club played its matches at Armazi Stadium, currently called Mtskheta Park.

History 
In the 2001–02 season the club participated in Regionuli Liga (eastern zone), where they took first place. 

In 2002–03 Mtskheta played in Pirveli Liga, where they finished third and qualified for a play-off game. After a 1:0 extra-time win against Gorda Rustavi they secured promotion to Umaglesi Liga. The next season the club took the 9th place in the league and was relegated after losing a play-off match, in which Gorda Rustavi took revenge for the previous year's loss. Following this season the club ceased to exist. 

In the Georgian Cup Mtskheta played 6 matches - 2 wins, 1 draw, 3 losses.

 2001: Founded as SC Mtskheta
 2004: Renamed to "Mtskheta-Urioni"
 2004: Dissolved.

Seasons 
 First team

{|class="wikitable"
|-bgcolor="#efefef"
! Season
! League
! Pos.
! Pl.
! W
! D
! L
! GF
! GA
! P
! Cup
! Notes
|-
|2001–02
|bgcolor=#98bb98|Regionuli Liga East
|align=right bgcolor=DBA901|1
|align=right|36||align=right|26||align=right|7||align=right|3
|align=right|77||align=right|17||align=right|85
|
|Mtskheta
|-
|2002–03
|bgcolor=#ffa07a|Pirveli Liga
|align=right bgcolor=cc9966| 3
|align=right|30||align=right|17||align=right|7||align=right|6
|align=right|50||align=right|23||align=right|58
|Round of 32
|Mtskheta
|-
|2003–04
|Umaglesi Liga
|align=right|9
|align=right|32||align=right|12||align=right|5||align=right|15
|align=right|39||align=right|60||align=right|31
|Round of 16
|Mtskheta-Urioni
|-
|}

 Second team

{|class="wikitable"
|-bgcolor="#efefef"
! Season
! League
! Pos.
! Pl.
! W
! D
! L
! GF
! GA
! P
! Cup
! Notes
|-
|2002–03
|bgcolor=#98bb98|Regionuli Liga East
|align=right|8
|align=right|26||align=right|11||align=right|4||align=right|11
|align=right|38||align=right|44||align=right|37
|
|Mtskheta 2
|-
|2003–04
|bgcolor=#98bb98|Regionuli Liga East
|align=right|6
|align=right|24||align=right|10||align=right|5||align=right|9
|align=right|41||align=right|32||align=right|35
|
|Mtskheta-Urioni 2
|-
|}

References

External links
on Soccerway

Mtskheta at footballfacts.ru

Mtskheta
2001 establishments in Georgia (country)
2004 disestablishments in Georgia (country)